Tauves is a commune in the Puy-de-Dôme department in Auvergne in central France.

Twin towns
Tauves is twinned with Castiglione di Sicilia, Italy.

See also
Communes of the Puy-de-Dôme department

References

Communes of Puy-de-Dôme